Lantz is a given name. Notable people with the name include:

Lantz Lamback (born 1986), American swimmer
Lantz L'Amour (born 1978), American musician

See also
Lantz (surname)